Plague Town is a 2008 American horror film directed by David Gregory, co-written by Gregory and John Cregan, and starring Josslyn DeCrosta, Erica Rhodes, and David Lombard.

Plot summary
While on holiday in the Irish countryside, a dysfunctional family encounters a village of deformed and homicidal residents. These residents are mostly mutant children,  to whom death is all fun and games.

Cast

Release
After debuting on March 28, 2009, at the HorrorHound Weekend film festival, the film was released on DVD on May 12, 2009. In Germany, the film was released on September 25, 2009.

Background 
The film is the first own directed film from Dark Sky Films and was the feature film debut for director David Gregory.

References

External links 
 
 

2008 horror films
2008 films
American science fiction horror films
American independent films
Films set in Ireland
Films about cannibalism
2000s science fiction horror films
2008 directorial debut films
2000s English-language films
2000s American films